The 2019 Northern Cape provincial election was held on 8 May 2019 to allocate the 30 seats of the Northern Cape Provincial Legislature. Like all the South African provincial elections, it was held on the same day as the South African general election. 21 political parties participated in the election, of which only the African National Congress, Democratic Alliance, Economic Freedom Fighters, and Freedom Front Plus won seats. The ANC lost two seats, but maintained a majority.

Premier Candidates

African National Congress 
There was some controversy prior to the election regarding the Northern Cape ANC's leadership. ANC Provincial Chairpersoni Dr. Zamani Saul won the premiership despite a long rivalry with the incumbent premier, Sylvia Lucas. Their rivalry was considered to be a proxy of that between Jacob Zuma and Cyril Ramaphosa, with Lucas supporting Zuma and Saul supporting Ramaphosa. The provincial ANC youth league endorsed Saul, with youth league secretary Xhanti Teki stating that Saul's track record proved he would be able to improve Northern Cape's economy. After leaving office, Lucas became the Deputy Chairperson of the National Council of Provinces.

Democratic Alliance 
In 2018, the DA announced that Andrew Louw would be their premier candidate in the upcoming election. The DA had plans to become the dominant party in the Northern Cape, however these plans failed.

Economic Freedom Fighters 
The EFF did not field premier candidates in any province, as they are opposed to the idea of provinces altogether. Shadrack Tlhaole was first on their party list.

Results

References

2019 elections in South Africa
2019 Northern Cape provincial election